Cosmochilus harmandi is a species of freshwater fish in the family of Cyprinidae. It is restricted to the Mekong and Chao Phraya rivers in Asia. This widespread species is an important food fish.

References 

Fish of Thailand
Cyprinid fish of Asia
Fish described in 1878